Ralph Williams (August 7, 1900 – July 6, 1941) was an American long-distance runner. He competed in the marathon at the 1924 Summer Olympics.  He made it on the US Olympic Team after finishing 7th in the Boston Marathon on April 19, 1924, with a time of 2:41:58.6.  The Boston Marathon was later measured and found to be 152 meters short.

1924 Summer Olympics
Prior to the marathon, the American team ran a 15-mile time trial.  It was a particularly warm day in Paris, where the Olympics were being held, and Williams quit after 3 miles.  Coach Michael Ryan, who didn't finish either of the two Olympic marathons he ran, suggested that Williams be pulled from the event.  The "head coach and the chairman of the Selection Committee" overruled Ryan and chose to run Williams rather than Carl Linder.  Williams did not finish the race.

References

External links
 

1900 births
1941 deaths
Athletes (track and field) at the 1924 Summer Olympics
American male long-distance runners
American male marathon runners
Olympic track and field athletes of the United States
Sportspeople from Quincy, Massachusetts
20th-century American people